The City of Whyalla (formally The Corporation of the City of Whyalla) is a local government area in South Australia, located at the north-east corner of the Eyre Peninsula. It was established in 1970, replacing the town commission, which had been running the town previously. The district is mostly industrial, with many large companies having factories in the city.

Suburbs and localities
As of 2015 and following a number of changes to boundaries and locality/suburb names in the years 2010 to 2014, the City of Whyalla consisted of the following suburbs and localities: Backy Point, Cowleds Landing, Douglas Point, Douglas Point South, False Bay, Fitzgerald Bay, Middleback Range (part), Mullaquana, Murninnie Beach, Point Lowly, Point Lowly North, Port Bonython, Whyalla, Whyalla Barson, Whyalla Jenkins, Whyalla Norrie, Whyalla Playford and Whyalla Stuart.

Two parcels of land within the City of Whyalla have been placed outside of the local government area into the unincorporated area of South Australia.  These are parts of False Bay and Whyalla Barson both associated with the Whyalla Steelworks and the east end of Mullaquana.  These parcels of land are considered by the Government of South Australia to "strategically important to the state" due to their role in the production cycle of steel.

Economy
The City of Whyalla local government area is based primarily around Whyalla, a town covering 41.5 km2, which holds the vast majority of the district's population. The district's economy is heavily reliant on the Whyalla Steelworks and associated companies located in Whyalla. To lesser extent, Whyalla is also a focal point for the surrounding agricultural areas.

Council

The City of Whyalla has a directly elected mayor.

Mayors of Whyalla

 Keith James Wilson (1970–1973)
 Colin (Murray) Norton (1973-1975)
 Aileen Christina Ekblom (1975-1991)
 Russell Reid (1991–1994)
 Keith James Wilson (1994–1997)
 John Donald Smith (1997–2003)
 Jim Pollock (2003–2016)
 Lyn Breuer (2016–2018)
 Clare McLaughlin (2018–present)

See also
Whyalla Airport

Citations and references

Citations

References

External links
Council Site
Whyalla Information Site

Whyalla
Whyalla